Tehran War Cemetery is a war cemetery located in Gholhak Garden in the Iranian city of Tehran and located within the British Embassy residential compound and is where over 500 British and Commonwealth soldiers who perished in the First and Second World Wars are buried.  The site includes the Tehran Memorial, dedicated to those who have no known grave or whose grave is unmaintained. The cemetery is managed by the Commonwealth War Graves Commission.

The cemetery also has markers for those who died in Persia and Russia without graves.

Gallery

References

External links
 

1962 establishments in Iran
Cemeteries in Tehran
Commonwealth War Graves Commission cemeteries in Iran